The 2015 World Series of Darts was a series of non-televised darts tournaments organised by the Professional Darts Corporation. There were 5 World Series events and one Final event being held – one in the United Arab Emirates, one in New Zealand, one in Japan, two in Australia, with the Finals being held in Glasgow, Scotland.

Prize money

World Series events

World Series qualifiers 

PDC Seeds
  Phil Taylor
  Michael van Gerwen
  Gary Anderson
  Peter Wright
  James Wade
  Adrian Lewis
  Raymond van Barneveld
  Stephen Bunting

Japan Masters 
  Morihiro Hashimoto
  Haruki Muramatsu 
  Yuki Yamada 
  Sho Katsumi 
  Masumi Chino
  Katsuya Aiba 
  Shintaro Inoue
  Chikara Fujimori  

Perth Masters 
  Simon Whitlock
  Kyle Anderson
  Laurence Ryder
  Paul Nicholson
  Kim Lewis
  David Platt
  Craig Caldwell
  Adam Rowe

Sydney Masters
  Simon Whitlock
  Paul Nicholson
  David Platt 
  Laurence Ryder 
  Craig Caldwell 
  Cody Harris 
  Tic Bridge 
  Warren Parry 

Auckland Masters
  Simon Whitlock 
  Paul Nicholson
  David Platt
  Rob Szabo 
  Laurence Ryder 
  Mark Cleaver 
  Rob Modra 
  Craig Caldwell

Quarter-finalists

References 

World Series of Darts